Pousa is a Portuguese freguesia ("civil parish"), located in the municipality of Barcelos. The population in 2011 was 2,272, in an area of 6.63 km².

Pousa is located in between the two sub-cities (Barcelos and Braga) in the northern region of Portugal. Many of its residents work in the sub-cities as they are within 30 minutes reach using motorised transport. It is surrounded by a beautiful mainstream river along with mountains filled with pine/oak trees. Forest fires are rare but not overlooked by authorities as there is at least one every year. Pousa has the Auto Estrada Porto-Valença running across through its border of its neighbour (Graca).

References

Freguesias of Barcelos, Portugal